Adams Pearmain, also called Adam's Parmane, is a cultivar of apple. It was introduced to the Horticultural Society of London in 1826 by Robert Adams, under the name Norfolk Pippin. The fruit is large, varying from two and a half inches to three inches high, and about the same in breadth at the widest part. It is pearmain-shaped, very even, and regularly formed. The skin is pale yellow tinged with green, and covered with delicate russet on the shaded side; but deep yellow tinged with red, and delicately streaked with livelier red on the side facing the sun. The flesh is reddish, crisp, juicy, rich, and sugary, with an agreeable and pleasantly perfumed flavor.

See also
 Pearmain

References

External links

 Orangepippin.com
 Description on Pomolopedia (French)

Apple cultivars
British apples